Mirror (stylized in all caps as MIRROR) is the tenth studio album by Japanese rock band Scandal. The album was released on January 26, 2022 by Victor Entertainment in Japan and JPU Records in Europe and North America. It features a total of ten songs, including "Living in the City" and "SPICE" as CD Bonus Tracks. The album peaked at number five on the weekly Oricon Albums Chart, Japan's music industry-standard popularity chart. This extended Scandal's streak of having all ten of their studio albums reach the top five of the Oricon chart upon release.

Background 
Mirror is Scandal's second album on their private record label "her The album features 10 songs in total, including the single songs released this year: eternal, Ivory, one more time.

Four editions were planned: Regular (CD only), Limited Edition A (CD+DVD), Limited Edition B (CD+Magazine), DVD+Merch (CD+DVD+Merch in a box).

Release 
Mirror was released on January 26, 2022. In addition to a regular edition, five other limited editions were also made available. Limited Edition A features SCANDAL DOCUMENTARY "her" Diary 2021 SPECIAL EDITION, Limited Edition B features the third volume of Scandal's "her" label magazine, the international Limited Edition from JPU Records was released on March 4, 2021 which includes English lyric translations and an English print of "her" label magazine, DVD+T-Shirt Edition features both the SCANDAL DOCUMENTARY "her" Diary 2021 SPECIAL EDITION with English subtitles DVD and a T-shirt with the album art,

Each physical copy sold in Japan is also accompanied by a clear folder featuring one of the band members (Mami's folder can be found with copies purchased from Tower Records, Haruna's from HMV, Tomomi's from Tsutaya, and Rina's from Scandal supporting stores).

Chart performance 
The album peaked at number five on Japan's Oricon weekly charts, extending Scandal's streak of having all ten of their studio albums reach the top five of the charts upon release. The album also charted on iTunes peaking at #6 in Japan.

Track listing

Personnel 
Scandal

 Haruna – lead vocals, rhythm guitar
 Mami – lead guitar, backing vocals, lead vocals on "Ivory"
 Tomomi – bass, backing vocals, lead vocals on "Ai No Shoutai" and "Living in the City"
 Rina – drums, backing vocals,lead vocals on "Kanojo wa wave"

Other

 Satori Shiraishi– arranger of "eternal" and "Ai No Shoutai"
 Kouhei Munemoto – arranger of "Ai ni Naranakatta no sa","Ivory" and "Prism"
 Hibiki Nishikawa– arranger of "Yuugure, Tokeru" and "Ao no Naru Yoru no Sukima de"
 Yuta Hashimoto - arranger of "one more time"

References 

Scandal (Japanese band) albums
Japanese-language albums
2022 albums